N72 may refer to:
 N72 (Long Island bus)
 London Buses route N72
 N72 road (Ireland)
 Nokia N72, a mobile phone
 Warwick Municipal Airport, in Orange County, New York, United States